Park Joon Geum (born 29 July 1962) is a South Korean actress. An alumnus of Kyung Hee University, Department of Dance, she is also a visiting professor in College of Culture and Arts Engineering, Kangwon National University. She made her acting debut in 1982 in KBS TV series Innocent love (순애). Better known for her role in TV series The Heirs (2013), she also appeared in; Secret Garden (2010), Rooftop Prince (2012), Queen of Mystery (2017), Marry Me Now (2018)  and Never Twice (2019). 

In 2018, she was awarded the "Top Excellence Award for an Actress in a Serial Drama" at the MBC Drama Awards for My Healing Love. She  appeared in romance TV series Be My Dream Family in 2021.

Filmography

Film

Television series

Awards and nominations

References

External links

 
 Park Joon-geum on Daum 

21st-century South Korean actresses
South Korean film actresses
South Korean television actresses
South Korean web series actresses
Living people
1962 births